Népszava (meaning "People's Word" in English) is a social-democratic Hungarian language newspaper published in Hungary.

History and profile
Népszava is Hungary's eldest continuous print publication and as of October 2019 the last and only remaining liberal, social democratic political daily in the country.

Népszava was established in 1873 in Budapest by Viktor Külföldi. It was the official newspaper of the Hungarian Social Democratic Party until 1948 when Hungary became a communist state. During this period two of Népszava's editors in chief were murdered: Béla Somogyi  (along with reporter Béla Bacsó) in 1920 by right wing officers and Illés Mónus in 1944 by members of the Hungarian Nazi Arrow Cross militia.

During the period of the Hungarian People's Republic between 1948 and 1989, it was the official newspaper of Hungarian trade unions. In 1990 it was privatized. Its publisher, the entrepreneur János Fenyő was shot dead in Budapest in 1998. The crime is still partially unsolved. The newspaper is currently owned by the entrepreneur Tamás Leisztinger.

Népszava is published in broadsheet format.

Circulation
The circulation of Népszava was 222,000 copies in January 1989 and 181,000 copies in January 1991. The paper had a circulation of 135,000 copies in July 1992 and 102,000 copies in March 1993. Its circulation was 80,000 copies in 1998. The paper had a circulation of 31,742 copies in 2009, making it the sixth most read daily in the country. The circulation further declined to 10,522 copies by 2016. After closure of Népszabadság, today Népszava is Hungary's market leader among political dailies. Its average circulation is 21 thousand copies/day with the 32-page Saturday edition reaching 24 thousand copies.

Notable staff
 Editors in chief
 Viktor Külföldi (from 1877)
 Ernő Garami (1898–1918)
 Árpád Szakasits (1939–1944, from 1945)
 Anna Kéthly (1957–1964)

Writers, publicists
 Endre Ady
 György Faludy
 Ferenc Fejtő
 Gyula Illyés
 Sándor Jemnitz, music critic (1924–1950)
 Attila József
 Margit Kaffka
 Gyula Kállai
 Lajos Kassák
 Anna Kéthly
 Dezső Kosztolányi
 Zsigmond Kunfi, deputy chief editor (from 1907)
 Géza Losonczy
 Miklós Radnóti

See also
List of newspapers in Hungary

References

1873 establishments in Hungary
Publications established in 1873
Newspapers published in Budapest
Hungarian-language newspapers
Social Democratic Party of Hungary
Daily newspapers published in Hungary